The Forces of the Democratic Alternative ( or  (FPAD), agdudan, Arabic: العقد السياسي لقوى البديل الديمقراطي; also: Democratic Alternative Forces Pact, Forces of the Pact of the Democratic Alternative) or FDA is a wide alliance of political parties and citizens' groups in Algeria created in mid 2019 during the 2019 Algerian protests, with the aim of organising a constituent assembly for a new political system with an independent judiciary and a transitionary period to democracy.

Creation
The Forces of the Democratic Alternative alliance was created in a meeting in Algiers on 26 June 2019 during the 2019 Algerian protests, among several political parties and prominent individuals. On 27 August, the FDA was forced by Algerian authorities to cancel a meeting it had planned for 28 August. The authorities did not explain why the meeting was forbidden. A formal convention between the participants was signed at a national meeting soon after, on 9 September 2019.

Members

Aims
The FDA aims to organise a constituent assembly for a new political system in Algeria with an independent judiciary and a transitionary period to democracy. It opposes the 12 December presidential election. Its call for a boycott was joined by other groups, including the Party of Liberty and Justice led by Mohamed Saïd and by the Justice and Development Front (FJD) led by Abdallah Djaballah.

The Dynamiques de la société civile, a coalition of trade unions, citizens' groups and individuals created on 15 June 2019 during Hirak, stated that it would cooperate with the FDA and similar alliances.

Actions
In early January 2020, the FDA proposed a "national democracy meeting" on 25 January 2020 for all those wishing for a "democratic alternative". The meeting would aim to debate mechanisms and the nature of the political transition and of the procedures of a constituent assembly.

The meeting was held on 25 January as planned, apart from a change of venue because the signed agreement to use the Safex hall was "tacitly" cancelled by the authorities the day before the meeting, with 400 participants from diverse political parties and citizens' associations. The participants agreed on what they saw as the illegitimacy of the 12 December 2019 presidential election and the new president's method of proposing modifications to the Algerian constitution. The organisers promised to hold another meeting to decide on the mechanisms of a "democratic, autonomous" institutional transition, during which "illegitimate institutions" would be dissolved, and to plan the procedures of organising a sovereign constituent assembly.

References

See also
Dynamiques de la société civile - Algerian Hirak alliance
Forces of Freedom and Change - wide, heterogeneous alliance of groups in the Sudanese Revolution

2018–2022 Arab protests
2019 establishments in Algeria
2019–2021 Algerian protests
Organizations established in 2019
Political opposition organizations
Political organisations based in Algeria
Political party alliances in Algeria